Veronika Vitzthum (born 11 March 1963) is a former Austrian alpine skier.

Career
During her career she has achieved 12 results among the top 10 (3 podiums) in the World Cup.

World Cup results
Top 3

References

External links
 
 

1963 births
Living people
Austrian female alpine skiers